Miasto Jest Nasze (Polish for The City Is Ours, styled as MJN) is an independent citizen platform launched in 2013 in Warsaw, as of 2014 registered as a non-profit civic association. Miasto Jest Nasze is considered to be one of the major urban movements in Poland. In 2018 Polish local elections coalition formed by Miasto Jest Nasze took 22 seats in Warsaw district councils.

Organization 
Miasto Jest Nasze counts more than 200 members (October 2021) and is led by board headed by Barbara Jędrzejczyk. The association is present in 10 of 18 Warsaw districts.

Activity 
Since its beginning, Miasto Jest Nasze focuses on exposing and publicizing malfunctions of Warsaw authorities. It supports transparency across all city functions as well as civic participation through participatory budgets and public consultations. As part of its activity, it monitors the work of politicians and city officials by publicizing irregularities in Warsaw's management and pressing on the importance of accountability. MJN uses tools typical to bottom-up organization (e.g. throwing up a street dance party) political party (e.g. running in elections) and think tanks (organizing conferences and publishing expert reports presenting alternative solutions).

Among its scope of interests are such issues as: sustainable transport in the city, community rights, environment (especially smog and preserving green areas in the city), land management, reprivatisation of Warsaw properties, participatory democracy.

Miasto Jest Nasze activity has been focusing on identifying and addressing critical issues, inter alia including the following:

 Urban development: promoting the long-term urban policy for a compact and functionally diverse city, the need of applying an active landscape policy for Warsaw and fighting visual advertisement chaos, example being the campaign “Żegnamy Reklamy” (“We say goodbye to advertisements”).
 Sustainable transport: supporting good practices in the further development of public transport and bicycle road infrastructure, promoting pedestrian-friendly space within the framework of the “Pedestrian Critical Mass”.
 Environment: recognizing the need for well-thought-out and environment-friendly solutions in the city, effective green area management and the urgency to fight smog. In 2017 MJN opened a temporary shop with “cigarettes for children”, in fact being a "Smog Information Center"– social campaign which met with a wide interest from nationwide media.
 Reprivatisation of Warsaw properties: Miasto Jest Nasze contributed to revealing the chaos and ambiguities around the process of real estate reprivatisation in Warsaw taking place in the capital intensely in the 1990s and 2000s (i.e. the handing back of properties to pre-communist owners due to change of political system). Broad publicity received maps revealing connections between politicians, including the mayor of Warsaw, lawyers, business people, and real estate companies. Miasto Jest Nasze was sued by some of individuals showed on the maps but won all cases.

Over the past years the activity of Miasto Jest Nasze has also been commented on in various foreign non-English press articles (including Frankfurter Rundschau, Mitteldeutscher Rundfunk, Le Monde, as well as Czech or Slovak media).

Warsaw municipal elections

2014 
In local elections in 2014 Miasto Jest Nasze won 7 seats in Warsaw 3 district councils (Śródmieście, Praga-Północ, Żoliborz).

2018 
In 2018 local elections the coalition of local urban movements led by MJN received 5,72% of votes, winning 22 seats in 7 district councils (Mokotów, Ochota, Rembertów, Wawer, Wesoła, Wola, Żoliborz). Justyna Glusman, MJN candidate for mayor of Warsaw, received 2,32% of votes. After the election she became member of the Warsaw mayor board as the Warsaw City Hall coordinator responsible for sustainable development, green area management and fighting smog.

In the local elections of 2018, Miasto Jest Nasza launched an informative campaign to encourage EU citizens living in Warsaw to register and vote in the elections. The site allowed to generate a fast and user-friendly registration application, an innovative solution aiming at promoting the participation of the wide group of foreigners living in the capital.

International cooperation 
Miasto jest Nasze is a member of the federation "Urban Movement Congress", which groups 40 organizations from around 20 Polish cities.

In June 2017 Miasto Jest Nasze members participated in the Fearless Cities Summit in Barcelona, organized by Barcelona en Comú within the global municipalist movement “Fearless Cities network”. In July 2018, Miasto Jest Nasze hosted the Fearless Cities CEE International Municipalist Summit in Warsaw. The first such conference to be held, it was a platform to exchange experiences on urban activism in the region, regrouping more than a hundred participants from Central and Eastern European municipalist movement organizations (including Spasi Sofia from Sofia, Ne Davimo Beograd from Belgrade, Praha sobě from Prague and Iare Pekhit from Tbilisi).

Election Results

Warsaw District Councils

References

External links 

 

2013 establishments in Poland
Political organisations based in Poland
Organisations based in Warsaw